The First Lutheran Church is a historic church building at 1700 Central Avenue in Hot Springs, Arkansas.  It is a single story structure with a stuccoed exterior and a long gabled roof.  Its main facade, facing east, has a centered entrance set in a stepped back rounded arch, with flanking windows that have ornamental ironwork on the outside.  An open belltower rises at the peak of the gable above the entrance.  Built in 1937 to a design by St. Louis architect Carl F. Schloemann, it is a distinctive late example of Mission Revival architecture in the city.  The Lutheran congregation for which it was built was established in 1915; the building was sold into private ownership in 1985.

The church was listed on the National Register of Historic Places in 2015.

See also
National Register of Historic Places listings in Garland County, Arkansas

References

Churches on the National Register of Historic Places in Arkansas
Churches completed in 1937
Churches in Garland County, Arkansas
National Register of Historic Places in Hot Springs, Arkansas
1937 establishments in Arkansas
Mission Revival architecture in Arkansas
Lutheran churches in Arkansas